The Marsa Sports Club is a sports ground in Marsa, Malta.  Address: Sqaq ta' Ċeppuna, Marsa, MRS, Malta.

History  
Marsa Sports Club was inaugurated by the British Armed Forces in 1902. The membership to Maltese people was highly restricted until 1971.

The cricket stadium has a grass outfield and a matting wicket. It has hosted all matches for the three editions of the Valletta Cup.

List of centuries

Twenty20 Internationals

See also
 Malta national cricket team

References

External links
Cricinfo Profile

Sport in Malta